Markku Laakso (born 1949  in Vampula) is a Finnish professor of medicine and a type 2 diabetes researcher. He was awarded the Matti Äyräpää Prize in 2007, the Kelly West Award in 2008, and the Finnish Science Award in 2015.

References

Finnish medical researchers
1949 births
Living people
20th-century Finnish scientists
21st-century Finnish scientists